Rajveer Singh (born 4 September 1986) is an Indian television actor and model. He is best known for playing lead roles in Sufiyana Pyaar Mera and Qurbaan Hua. From August 2022 to March 2023, he was playing the role of Arjun Singh Thakur in  Rajjo

Career 
Before becoming an actor, he was a farmer. In 2014, He made his television debut in the show Ishq Kills as Rajveer and Samar. In 2017, he appear as Abeer Anand, the male protagonist in Kya Qusoor Hai Amala Ka?; the Indian remake of the popular Turkish drama, Fatmagül'ün Suçu Ne?. In 2019, he appear in Sufiyana Pyaar Mera as Zaroon Shah.

From 2020 to 2021, he replaced Karan Jotwani as Neel Dhyani in Qurbaan Hua. From August 2022 to March 2023, he portrayed the main lead Arjun Singh Thakur in StarPlus' show  Rajjo. For his role in the series, he lost 8 kilograms.

Television

References

External links

1986 births
Living people
21st-century Indian male actors
Indian male television actors
Indian male models
Male actors from Haryana
People from Jhajjar district